Piyaporn Sankosik is a Thai businesswoman and beauty pageant identity. She is the managing director of TPN Global, an organizer of Miss Universe 2018 and a license holder of Miss Universe Thailand and Miss Thailand and tv personality.

References

External links

Living people
Piyaporn Sankosik
Piyaporn Sankosik
Assumption University (Thailand) alumni
Year of birth missing (living people)
Thai businesspeople